Parched with Thirst Am I and Dying is a compilation album by the Swiss extreme metal band Celtic Frost, released in 1992. It consists of album tracks, demos and various other recordings of the band.

Track listing

Personnel 
Celtic Frost
Thomas Gabriel Warrior – guitars, lead and backing vocals, effects
Martin Eric Ain – bass (tracks 3, 5, 6, 10, 11, 13–15), backing vocals, effects
Reed St. Mark – drums (3, 5, 10, 11, 13–15), backing vocals
Curt Victor Bryant – bass, guitars, backing vocals
Oliver Amberg – guitars (tracks 7, 12)
Stephen Priestly – drums (tracks 2, 4, 6, 7, 9, 12, 16, 17), drum programming (tracks 1, 18), backing vocals

References 

1992 compilation albums
Celtic Frost albums
Noise Records compilation albums
Compilation albums by Swiss artists